Tres is a collection of poems by the Chilean author Roberto Bolaño, originally published in Spanish in 2000 and scheduled to be published in a bilingual edition in September 2011, translated into English by Laura Healy. The collection is composed of three sections:
 “Prose from Autumn in Gerona” - a series of prose poems.
 “The Neochileans” - a travel narrative in verse concerned with a young band on tour in the far reaches of Chile.
 “A Stroll Through Literature” - a series of short poems.
A selection of 16 poems from the book was published in BOMB Magazine in March 2011.

External links
 16 poems by Roberto Bolaño - BOMB Magazine, March 2011.

2000 poetry books
Chilean poetry collections
Spanish-language poems
Works by Roberto Bolaño